David Hoover Barr, Jr. (born May 9, 1972) is a former American football quarterback who played for two seasons in the National Football League (NFL) and World League of American Football (WLAF). He played for the St. Louis Rams in 1995 and for the Scottish Claymores in 1997. He was drafted by the Philadelphia Eagles in the fourth round of the 1995 NFL Draft, but did not make the team. He played college football at California.  At California, he earned the Joe Roth award in 1994. Barr holds the Cal record for highest single season passer rating (164.5), is sixth in career passing yards, fourth in career passing touchdowns, and fifth in career total offense. He attended Concord High School in Concord, California where he led the football team to the NCS 2A final before losing to Marin Catholic at the Oakland Coliseum.

References

1972 births
Living people
American football quarterbacks
California Golden Bears football players
Philadelphia Eagles players
St. Louis Rams players
Scottish Claymores players
Players of American football from Oakland, California